Shaka Zulu is a 1986 South African television series directed by William C. Faure and written by Joshua Sinclair for the South African Broadcasting Corporation (SABC), based on his 1985 novel of the same name.

It focuses on the rise of the Zulu, and their leader, Shaka, his wars, and the British administration. The series consists of 10 episodes of approximately 55 minutes each. It was aired in South Africa from October, and in the United States in syndication from November.

Plot 
The series is based on the story of the king of the Zulu, Shaka (reigned 1816 to 1828), and the writings of the British traders with whom he interacted. It also covers the broader Mfecane period alongside the rapid expansion of the Zulu state. The story is described primarily via flashbacks by Dr Henry Fynn, an Irish doctor.

Episodes 
 (24 October) Commencing in 1823, it introduces the main characters, including Shaka, Lieutenant Francis Farewell and Dr. Henry Fynn, against a background of increasing fear of a Zulu attack on the Cape Colony.
 (31 October) After Farewell's expedition is shipwrecked, they are taken to Shaka's capital, Kwa Bulawayo. Here, cultures clash as Shaka seeks to master their technology.
 (7 November) Fynn narrates the backstory of Shaka's illegitimate birth in 1787, to Senzangakona, a prince of the Zulu, and Nandi, a woman of the Elangeni. 
 (14 November) Nandi's tribe compels Senzangakona to accept her as a second wife. However, after nine further marriages in as many years, she is often humiliated by Senzangakhona and goes back to the Elangeni kingdom where she and Shaka are constantly humiliated and flees into exile with her children and her mother who dies of starvation. Nandi and her children take refuge among the Qwabe people.
 (21 November) As Shaka grows up, he is forced to flee his home among the Qwabe when his father, Senzangakhona and his people are looking for him. In 1815, he is helped by Dingiswayo of the Mtetwa, where he begins formulating his new military disciplines. 
 (28 November) Shaka trains his new military unit into an elite fighting force. After his father dies, in 1817, his half-brother becomes king but Shaka assassinates him at his initiation and assumes total control. 
 (5 December) The story moves ahead to 1824 when an attempt is made on Shaka's life by his half-brother. Surviving with the help of Fynn, Shaka grants Farewell lands and trading rights in perpetuity.
 (12 December) Realising the legacy power of the written word, Shaka begins narrating stories of his rise, including surreal and occult aspects, to Fynn. It also covers the beheading of Dingiswayo during the conflict with Zwide.
 (19 December) In 1827, the sailors at Port Natal build a boat, with Zulu assistance, and sail envoys to Cape Town where they are poorly received. Meanwhile, Shaka has his illegitimate son killed and his mother becomes ill.
 (19 December) Nandi dies, sending Shaka into a dangerous mindset where the Zulu nation should suffer too. Farewell's party returns in 1828 to find widespread chaos and devastation, culminating in Shaka's assassination.

Production 
The series was written by Joshua Sinclair for the South African Broadcasting Corporation (SABC). It was based on his 1985 novel of the same name. Harmony Gold USA partly funded and distributed Shaka Zulu in spite of the economic sanctions at the time. It was directed by William C Faure. The executive producer was Leon Rautenbach, and the composer was Dave Pollecutt.

The lead actor, Henry Cele, was an international star, performing in his native South Africa and in the United States as well. He was selected for the role after performing the same role in a South African stage production called Shaka Zulu.

Cele appeared again in 2001 as Shaka in the 3-hour 2-part miniseries, also written and directed by Sinclair, called Shaka Zulu: The Citadel. Set in winter 1827, Fox also reprised his role as Farewell, and also starred David Hasselhoff and Karen Allen. It was also released in a 2-hour telemovie version called Shaka Zulu: The Last Great Warrior.

Simon Sabela also organised the dance routines in the original 1964 Zulu film, and played Cetshwayo in Zulu Dawn in 1979.

Cast 
Henry Cele – Shaka
Edward Fox – Lieutenant Francis Farewell
Robert Powell – Dr. Henry Fynn/Narrator
Trevor Howard – Lord Charles Henry Somerset
Sokesimbone Kubheka – Chief Cetshwayo
Fiona Fullerton – Elizabeth Farewell
Christopher Lee – Lord Bathurst
Dudu Mkhize – Nandi
Roy Dotrice – King George IV
Gordon Jackson – Professor Bramston
Kenneth Griffith – Zacharias Abrahams
Conrad Magwaza – Senzangakhona
Patrick Ndlovu – Mudli
Roland Mqwebu – Ngomane
Gugu Nxumalo – Mkabayi
Tu Nokwe – Pampata
Washington Sixolo – Bhebhe 
Daphney Hlomuka – Queen Ntombazi
Simon Sabela – Dingiswayo.
 Nomsa Xaba – Sitayi the isangoma

Reception
Although popular, the series was criticised by the Los Angeles Times for its character portrayals and focus on violence.

Soundtrack
The theme song of the series, "We Are Growing", was sung by Margaret Singana.

Charts

References

External links
 
 Shaka Zulu at SideReel

Cultural depictions of Shaka
Cultural depictions of George IV
History of South Africa
Films set in South Africa
Television series set in the 19th century
South African television miniseries
South African drama television series
South African Broadcasting Corporation television shows
Television shows set in South Africa
First-run syndicated television programs in the United States
1986 South African television series debuts
1986 South African television series endings
1980s South African television series
Films set in pre-colonial sub-Saharan Africa